SPAG or Spag may refer to:

 Submarine Parachute Assistance Group of Britain's Royal Navy, assists in submarine rescues
 Anthony "Spag" Borgatti (1916–1996), founder of Spag's discount store in Massachusetts
 St. Petersburg Immobilien und Beteiligungs AG (SPAG), a company suspected of links with the Cali Cartel organised crime group
  Spelling, punctuation and grammar
 Sperm-associated antigen, human proteins, including:
 SPAG1: Sperm-associated antigen 1
 SPAG5: Sperm-associated antigen 5
 SPAG6: Sperm-associated antigen 6
 SPAG7: Sperm-associated antigen 7
 SPAG8: Sperm-associated antigen 8
 SPAG9: Sperm-associated antigen 9
 SPAG11B: Sperm-associated antigen 11B

See also
 Spag bol, slang for spaghetti bolognese, a pasta dish